Museums Victoria is an organisation which operates three major state-owned museums in Melbourne, Victoria: the Melbourne Museum, the Immigration Museum and Scienceworks Museum. It also manages the Royal Exhibition Building and a storage facility in Melbourne's City of Merri-bek.

History 
The museum traces its history back to the establishment of the "Museum of Natural and Economic Geology" by the Government of Victoria, William Blandowski and others in 1854.

The Library, Museums and National Gallery Act 1869 incorporated the Museums with the Public Library and the National Gallery of Victoria; but this administrative connection was severed in 1944 when the Public Library, National Gallery and Museums Act came into force, and they became four separate institutions once again.

Museums Victoria was founded in its current form under the Australian Museums Act (1983). Currently, Museums Victoria's State Collections holds over 17 million items, including objects relating to Indigenous Australian and Pacific Islander cultures, geology, historical studies, palaeontology, technology & society, and zoology Museums Victoria also contains a library collection that holds some of Australia’s rarest and finest examples of 18th and 19th century scientific monographs and serials.

Significant events in the Museum's history include:
 1854 – Founding of the "Museum of Natural and Economic Geology" by William Blandowski and others; Blandowski oversees the museum
 1856 – Collections moved to the University of Melbourne in Parkville by Frederick McCoy
 1858 – McCoy appointed first "director" of the museum
 1862 – New building opens on University site, museum renamed "National Museum of Victoria"
 1869 – National Museum, embryotic Industrial & Technological (I&T) Museum, National Gallery of Victoria (NGV) and Public Library of Victoria merged into a single body
 1870 – I&T Museum opened on Swanston Street site (behind the Public Library)
 1893 – I&T Museum opens new building on Russell St as part of Library complex
 1899 – National Museum moved to I&T Museum's building, and takes over its mineral collection; rest of I&T Museum put into storage
 1915 – I&T Museum reopens in Library's now surplus Queens Hall, thanks largely to George Swinburne and John Monash
 1927 – National Museum acquired the H. L. White Collection of Australian native bird eggs
 1944 – Museums organisationally re-separated from Library, NGV and each other; all remain in one building
 1945 – I&T Museum renamed Museum of Applied Science (MAS)
 1946 – MAS takes over Melbourne Observatory
 1969 – NGV moves to St Kilda Rd, MAS moves into its old buildings, Library gets back Queens Hall
 1961 – Museum of Applied Science renamed Institute of Applied Science
 1971 – Institute of Applied Science renamed Science Museum of Victoria
 1981 – Museum Station opened, providing train services
 1983 – National Museum of Victoria and Science Museum of Victoria amalgamated to form the Museum of Victoria (NMV)
 1992 – Scienceworks opened in Spotswood
 1997 – Swanston Street campus closed
 1998 – Museum of Victoria renamed Museum Victoria; Immigration and Hellenic Antiquities Museum opened
 2000 – Melbourne Museum at Carlton Gardens opened
 2016 – Museum Victoria renamed Museums Victoria

Administration 
The present chief executive officer of Museums Victoria is Lynley Crosswell (formerly Marshall), who was previously the head of the Australian Broadcasting Corporation’s international arm. Crosswell is the first woman to lead the organisation in its history.

Former directors include:
 1858 – Frederick McCoy
 1899 – Walter Baldwin Spencer
 1928 – James A. Kershaw
 1931 – Daniel James Mahony
 1957 – Charles. W. Brazenor
 1962 – John McNally
 1979 – Barry Wilson
 1984 – Robert Edwards
 1990 – Graham Morris
 1998 – George F. MacDonald
 2002 – Dr J. Patrick Greene

Library 
The Museums Victoria Library collection was first established in the 1850s as a working collection for the Museum's curators, and has developed into one of the best collections of natural history books and journals in Australia. The library was located at Melbourne University until 1906 when it moved, with the museum, to be co-located with the Public Library.

Today, the library collection is located at Melbourne Museum and contains 40,000 titles, which includes around 1,000 titles that are considered to be rare due to one or a combination of factors, including: value; scarcity; aesthetic qualities; historic, scientific or institutional significance; fragility; or age. Collection strengths include natural history in the fields of zoology, geology and palaeontology, scientific expedition reports, society and institutional journal titles, Indigenous cultures of Australia and the Pacific, Australian history, technology, colonial and other exhibition catalogues, museum studies, and Museums Victoria publications.

Many items from the Museums Victoria Library have been digitised for the Biodiversity Heritage Library as Museums Victoria is the home to the Australian node of this project. The digitisation operation is hosted by Museums Victoria and is nationally funded by the Atlas of Living Australia.

Significant works

See also
 Melbourne Museum
 Immigration Museum
 Scienceworks
 Royal Exhibition Building
 State Library Victoria

References

External links
Museums Victoria website
Virtual tour of the Museums Victoria provided by Google Arts & Culture

Museums established in 1983
Museums in Melbourne
Archaeological museums in Australia
Natural history museums in Australia
Ethnographic museums in Australasia
Technology museums in Australia
1983 establishments in Australia
Museum organizations